Oxathiapiprolin (trade names Orondis, Zorvec, and Segovis) is a fungicide.  In the United States, the Environmental Protection Agency has approved it for use against several fungal diseases including downy mildew and various Phytophthora species including late blight on crops including vegetables, ornamentals, and turf.

Its mechanism of action involves binding to the oxysterol-binding protein in Oomycetes.

References

Fungicides
Fluoroarenes
Isoxazolines
Thiazoles
Piperidines
Pyrazoles
Trifluoromethyl compounds